1985 Dakar Rally also known as the 1985 Paris–Dakar Rally was the seventh running of the Dakar Rally event. The race began at Versailles. Patrick Zaniroli and Jean Da Silva won the car class for the Mitsubishi team. Gaston Rahier won his second successive motorcycle class.

Final standings

Bikes

Cars

References

Dakar Rally
Paris
Paris
1985 in African sport